Granulometry is the measurement of the size distribution in a collection of grains.

 Granulometry (morphology), granulometry computation using the morphological opening operation
 Optical Granulometry, computation of granulometries from images, and its use in mines
 Measurement of grain sizes or particle sizes.

See also
Granulation (disambiguation)
Granule (disambiguation)